Cubix (Korean: 큐빅스; retitled 로보짱 큐빅스 for the KBS broadcast; subtitled Robots for Everyone in the United States) is a South Korean animated television series created by Cinepix. 4Kids Entertainment acquired the rights for an English-language dub to the series in 2001, retaining them until their transfer to Saban Brands (a subsidiary of Saban Capital Group) in June 2012. Following the closure of Saban Brands on July 2, 2018, it is assumed that Hasbro owns the copyright for the English dub. In the United States, it aired on Kids' WB! in August 11, 2001 until May 10, 2003.

Production 
Cubix was created by the Korean company called Cinepix and licensed by 4Kids Entertainment in North America, and aired for two seasons on Kids' WB!, lasting from August 11, 2001 to May 10, 2003. In May 2001, 4Kids teamed up with a major quick-service restaurant (QSR) to promote the show. The promotion ran for five weeks nationwide. The show had toys in Burger King kids meals and at retail stores. Trendmasters had the toy license to the series.

The show has been the theme of three video games: Showdown, Clash 'n' Bash, and Race 'n' Robots.

Plot and setting 
Cubix, takes place in the futuristic year of 2044, is the story of a bright-eyed young boy named Connor with a deep fascination for robots. His father, Graham, who dislikes all robots, has never truly been supportive of his efforts. That is, until they move to Bubble Town, a city with "as many robots as people," and the location of RobixCorp. The reason for RobixCorp's global success is the EPU (Emotion Processing Unit), which allows a robot to develop their own unique personality, just like a human being.

Now that Connor's dream has finally come true, he finds himself with one really big problem: everyone in Bubble Town owns a robot, except him. Shortly after his arrival, he meets his nosy neighbor Abby, who sends her flying pet robot, Dondon, to spy on him. Graham, being not so fond of a robot spying on him, attempts to capture Dondon. During his escape, he crashes into Connor, knocking him out. A worried Abby, along with Connor, hop onto her hover scooter, rushing for the one place in town that can fix her friend.

Here, Connor meets Hela, who runs a repair shop called The Botties' Pit. However, to become an employee, he has to fix a robot in less than 24 hours. Of all the robots he could have chosen, Connor picks Cubix, a one of a kind test model referred to as the 'Unfixable Robot.' The Botties all tried to repair him, especially Hela, who could never quite throw him out. Cubix is the one memory left of her father, Professor Nemo, who invented the EPU. Sadly, he vanished after an experiment with a highly volatile substance known as Solex.

Suddenly, a rogue robot inventor named Dr. K runs off with a stolen robot, leaving the Botties' Pit on the verge of collapse. Connor races back inside in a final effort to save Cubix, leaving him trapped inside. This act of kindness jumpstarts Cubix's EPU, bringing him back to life. With only a moment to spare, Cubix saves Connor from the collapsing building. It was never a matter of hardware; rather, of heart, that fixed the 'Unfixable Robot'. Therefore, Connor passed the test, earning him a place in the club.

That was not the only surprise Cubix had in store, with his amazing design he can transform into virtually anything. Along with their new friends, Connor and Cubix face up against Dr. K to take back the kidnapped bot.

This series follows the adventures and discoveries of the group, as they unravel Dr. K.'s conspiracy and the disappearance of Professor Nemo.

Solex 
Solex was stated to have been discovered after an alien spacecraft crashed outside of RobixCorp, shortly before Prof. Nemo's disappearance. It has two forms: the glowing electric blue liquid form prone to random energy fluctuations and the second, more stable crystallized form used in most robots. The story suggests that it has a psychic nature as it reacts to sentient thoughts and emotions, even those of robot's EPUs. Solex in both liquid and crystallized form is capable of producing immense power. Its "radioactive" glow (in crystallized form) is similar to pure isolated radium.

Solex in the first season 
In the first season, Dr. K collects Solex from infected robots to utilize in his ultimate plan with the aid of an alien disguising himself as Raska, the RobixCorp spokeswoman. It is suspected that the Solex was originally discovered by Prof. Nemo, but fearing the misuse of its power, separated the liquid Solex into small doses, placing them in random robots (or that the explosion in his lab the day he disappeared caused the Solex he was experimenting with to be transferred into the robots that were in his lab at the time).

The liquid Solex, however, produces unexpected effects in robots; this is referred to as Solex infection. As the EPU is placed under heavy stress or emotions, the uncontrollable energy reaction of the liquid Solex causes them to malfunction and go berserk. Besides the behavioral malfunction, the infected robot also gains extreme power far beyond its normal capabilities. However, this extreme power could overload the host and cause self-destruction unless the Solex is removed, the robot is deactivated, or its energy returns to normal levels.

In the beginning of the first season, the Botties were unaware of K's reasons for chasing after robots, but eventually learned of the existence of Solex and soon began racing Dr. K in the search, intercepting the last few robots to possess it before he could extract it. Dr. K's plans were delayed when Kan-It unintentionally absorbed half the Solex he had collected, which ended up in the possession of the Botties. Needing more, K launched an attack on the Botties Pit to get the Solex in their possession, only for Cubix to drive them off while revealing that he possessed crystallized Solex. Changing tactics, Dr. K and the Alien devised a plan to deactivate Cubix and take some of his Solex crystals. Adding it to what he possessed, Dr. K was able to power a humongous EPU he had created, which he then used to transform his HQ into the Kulminator. In the end, Cubix sacrificed himself to defeat Kulmintor and destroy the Solex within them both. Cubix would then be revived by the last remaining traces of Solex (obtaining the ability to speak on his own in the process), ending the threat of Solex for good.

Characters 
The titular Cubix is a one of a kind robot built before Professor Nemo's disappearance, who is found deactivated without visible damage, but no way to reactivate him either. He is introduced as part of Connor's initiation ceremony as the robot he chooses to fix. However, he cannot get Cubix to work until Dr. K appears to retrieve Solex from a robot. Connor brings Cubix back to life, just as the building they are in starts to fall apart. His body is made out of a number of cubes, giving him a versatile modular function- by restructuring himself and using different gadgets within the cubes, he can transform into a hover bike, an airplane, a helicopter and plenty more. He can even fly causing not need to transform into a vehicle. Hidden in each cube there is a different gadget with a solution to almost every serious situation. When it comes to fighting, Cubix is exceptionally strong, but often relies on his transformation  ability and eccentric strategies to win. He is powered by a generator that runs off crystallized Solex, which is rumored to be the ultimate power source, but nobody knows exactly how it works. Cubix's body is also constructed out of a highly resistant metal that is capable of withstanding devastating amounts of damage without breaking and reversing the effects of rust. He also has additional parts that when added to his structure can increase his strength. Cubix's  modular cubes contain special items that may contribute to the transformations like a Glue gun, ForceField generator, and an extra arm. The orange discs on cubix's body can separate and hit enemies with a shock on impact. Cubix can control his body parts to attack enemies when he is pinned and if he has enough energy he is able to generate a small forcefield on his chest to prevent enemies from getting to his power source.

Cubix is a friendly and helpful robot, but lacks speech capability, while speaking seems to be common place among other robots. Usually he just repeats what people around him say, and uses the LED display where his eyes usually are to communicate emotions. However, later in the series this improves greatly and he becomes capable of forming sentences and dialogues, and once he regains the crystallized Solex at the end of the season 1 finale, he repossesses the capacity for independent speech, He uses less of his abilities as the series goes on; however, this may be due to not having as much Solex after fighting Kulminator.

Humans

Botties 
Connor: The main human character of the series, Connor is obsessed with robots. He moved to Bubble Town, and soon after joined the 'Botties' by fixing the 'Unfixable Robot', Cubix. Perpetually optimistic, yet kind of hard-headed, he resents his father for not answering questions about his late mother. He is best friends with Abby, as they often play 'virtual battle' video games at her house. Him and the Botties hang out at his dad's donut shop and Hela's repair shop, the Botties' Pit.

Abby: Connor's neighbor, best human friend, and fellow robot-lover, Abby was the first person to show Connor around Bubble Town. She has red hair with two ponytails, hazel eyes, wears a pink and violet shirt, violet pants, and white shoes. She seems to always expose her tummy for a reason. She's a member of the Botties and her pet robot, Dondon, has been her best friend since she was younger. She's a bit impatient and a bit of a procrastinator but she has a sweet compassionate side. Abby loves robots and looks up to Hela almost like the older sister, and secretly wishes to be just like her someday. She can often be found in her room studying robot repair manuals.

Chip: He may be short but at only 10, he is probably the smartest of the Botties. He knows practically everything about robots. At times he can be a know-it-all who only sees things his way. He is actually very insecure about his height and can come across as awkward or nervous. His robot, Cerebrix is a specialized calculation model. He is best friends with Mong.

Mong: The taller and chubbier member of the Botties, Mong loves snacks and making puns that only he ends up laughing at. He seems dense but he is actually pretty inventive and has a big heart. Highly competitive and a bit prideful, he rushes headlong into things, sometimes ignoring the consequences. His robot is Maximix, originally a fitness trainer model. Mong converted him into a motor bike. He is best friends with Chip.

Hela Nemo: The daughter of Professor Nemo and the idol of Abby, she is the owner of the Botties Pit. Hela knows almost everything about robot repair. She is pretty even keeled, and is usually a source of advice and comfort to her young apprentices.  Her robot team includes Diagnostix, Mr. Fixit, Ixpressive, and Attractix (named Kan-It). She also acts as a motherly figure to Connor and despite the arguments she has with his stubborn father it is joked about in the series that she likes him.

Villains 
Dr. K: The main antagonist of the series, Dr. K used to work for RobixCorp, but lost his arm in a lab explosion and now as a rogue robot inventor who uses his smarts for evil. In Season 1, he is after a substance called Solex to build the ultimate robot and destroy Bubble Town. His main robot is Kolossal, but he has his own line of evil robots such as Katastrophe, Kannon, Krab, Klawber, the Kulminator and Kilobot. It is unclear what happened to Dr. K at the end of the series finale, though it is possible that he gave up his evil ways.

Raska: Bubble Town's most famous celebrity, Raska is the spokesmodel for RobixCorp. Raska does not have any robots of her own besides the Cinematixes that film her. Near the end of Season 1, it is revealed that Raska is the alien from the spaceship that crashed outside RobixCorp, and (using her human disguise) became a member of Prof. Nemo's team (most likely in order to retrieve the Solex). Raska and Dr. K are shown to be in some sort of association in order to acquire Solex for their own goals. For most of the season, Raska's true alien form is only seen on Dr. K's screen when communicating with him and is kept in complete silhouette. Her true from is fully shown in the final two episodes of the first season. She is killed when Dr. K's giant robot is destroyed by Cubix.

Miscellaneous 
Graham: Connor's father, who owns and runs Bubble Town's most popular donut shop. He dislikes robots, especially the dysfunctional Waitrixes that work at his shop causing him continuous aggravation, yet he developed an exception for Cubix. He believes in good old manual labor and resents how robots have made people lazier over the years. He is a loving father, but has a hard time showing it. Sometimes he cannot quite express how he feels, particularly about his wife's death. This causes a bit of strain on his relationship with Connor. It is also hinted he has a crush on Hela.

Taryn: Connor's late mother, who supposedly died when he was younger. Connor keeps a picture of her in his room as a memory.

Professor Nemo: The ultimate robotist, Professor Nemo was the one who built Cubix and invented the EPU. He disappeared in the aforementioned lab explosion caused by Solex, but was later found kidnapped by Dr. K. A giant sculpture of the Prof. stands in the grand hall of RobixCorp. He designed all of his robots with a yellow spiral.

Charles: A spoiled brat and the richest kid in town. Charles is the son of the Mayor and his family has important connections, so he gets all the latest models from RobixCorp. His favorite robot, Quixtreme 5000, is a rare pre-release model given to him as a special birthday gift, that will not be on the market for 10 years! Called Cheetah for short, he can transform into a cherry red Rolls-Royce hover car, a cheetah, and an armored battling robot. This makes Charles think he can gain entry into the Botties. It is implied that he has a bit of a crush on Abby and is jealous of Connor. He often follows them around, showing off.

Robots

Botties Robots 
Maximix:
Maximix is Mong's robot. Maximix has a unicycle propulsion instead of legs and is also capable of transforming into a Go-kart like vehicle to provide Mong with transportation. Although not as strong as Cubix or Kolossal, Maximix has proven himself to be a formidable opponent on several occasions. He can hold his own against Kolossal or any of Dr. K's robots. Thanks to his unicycle propulsion he can reach high speeds and is quite agile. His personality is similar to his master: hot=headed, competitive and a little conceited, but always reliable. Maximix's voice is similar to that of Arnold Schwarzenegger.

Dondon:
Dondon is Abby's pet robot has been her best friend since she was 6 years old. Dondon is a personal interaction and entertainment robot, outfitted with hovering capabilities allowing him to flutter about for indefinite periods of time. So, although he has wings they are more decorative. Being small and defenseless, Dondon is not a fighter, although there are times when he has shown great courage in order to protect his friends. His features include a video phone inside his chest cavity, secret recording devices, a camera, and a storage pouch. His yellow face also glows in the dark. His personality is very playful and imaginative- he sometimes pretends to be a secret agent for Abby, disguising himself with her jewelry and hair accessories. Though creative, Dondon is needy of Abby and can be quite bashful with strangers.

Cerebrix:
Cerebrix is Chip's robot. Like his master, Cerebrix is more of a thought focused character rather than feeling. Bipedal, with no arms, he is equipped with advanced memory, sensory, computing and processing systems stored in his "large head". He can also fly by means of a retractable propeller stored in an upper compartment of his head. His main functions include a huge sensory array and he is also equipped with two antennae through which he can tap into almost any communication wavelength and cause disturbances, creating confusion in his foes. Also his advanced probability computing system is capable of determining the outcomes of events before they occur. His personality and speech are much more machine-like but what he has to say is usually very important.

Kan-it:
Kan-It is an Attractix model, and the only bot not to be own by a Bottie. Kan-It has a passion for singing, and as such was nicknamed Kan-It because Dr. K, his original master, did not like it. Kan-It speaks in a stereotypical British accent, saying cockney phrases like "Governor" and "Blimey". Kan-It control's his magnetic power by saying Magnet On (Positive Charge), Magnet Off! (Neutral Charge), Reverse Polarity (Negative Charge). Kan-It currently resides at the Botties Pit.

Villainous Robots 
Negator First appearing in the second season, Negator is one of Dr. K's more powerful creations. He was abandoned by Dr K due to his power being too out of control. He is able  to trap people inside of his skeleton and manipulate their thoughts. he is then able  to release powerful shockwaves from the negative energy his host gives off. After his battle with cubix Dr K put negator's epu into kilobot's upgraded body.

Kilobot: First appearing in the second season, Kilobot is a vampiric and demonic robot that is far smarter than any of his cohorts being able to manipulate people incredibly easy. Kilobot did not have an epu originally until Negator became the host. Dr. K describes him as his finest creation, developed to absorb data from other robots. Kilobot's name comes from the fact that he has the potential to copy the powers of up to 1000 other robots. As such, his power is potentially unlimited. Kilobot originally appeared in a bat-like form, but later upgraded to a bulkier body designed after Cubix's cubes. Kilobot is Cubix's new arch-enemy. In the series finale, he took control of Dr. K's robots and planned an ultimate takeover. However, he was permanently deactivated by his own Zombot.

Klank: Klank was one of Dr. K's first robots from when he was a child. Klank originally had no EPU, so when the botties found Klank in a disposal room at RobixCorp, they install one to help him adjust to the modern world. Klank's new emotions drive him to seek out Dr. K at an old abandoned house. Unlike Dr. K's other robots, Klank only appears in one episode.

Kolossal: A Frankenstein's monster-esque robot, Kolossal is the brute of Dr. K's forces. Not too intelligent and continuously relies on his master for orders but almost equal to Cubix in fighting ability, Kolossal serves as Cubix's nemesis in the first part of the show. Kolossal's equipped with various weapons but most importantly a detachable floating platform on his left shoulder where Dr. K. takes seat. Kolossal is big and strong, although bulky he is capable of limited flight and agile high jumps, his left hand is a sort of claw that can be launched to grab things from afar. Most of the time he uses only brute force to win. Without his master's continuous coordination however he can only complete basic tasks.

Krab: Squat and crustacean-like, Krab has powerful claws and shoulders that contain a variety of weapons.

Katastrophe: A robot capable of splitting into two halves. Katastrophe's top half can fly, while the bottom rolls around on a wheel.

Kannon: An artillery robot developed by Dr. K, his body is an assembly of cannons.

Klawber: Menace of the skies, Klawber is a super-fast plane that flies through the air.

Kulminator: Dr. K's second most powerful robot (behind Kilobot). It was once Dr. K's HQ as a giant advertisement tower in an abandoned area of Bubble Town. After Dr. K had gathered enough Solex, he used it to create a humongous EPU which transformed his HQ into a giant four-legged robot. Dr. K piloted it on a course for Bubble Town with intentions to destroy it. The Botties (piloting Krab, Katastrophe, Klawber, and Kannon) attempted to stop it, but it was too big. The Alien then used the Kulminator's ultimate weapon, the Solex Blaster, to destroy Cubix, but he absorbed the energy and then fired a Solex blast of his own, knocking out the Kulminator's shields. Dr. K wanted to retreat, but the Alien was determined to continue, firing the Solex Blaster at everything while Dr. K abandoned ship. Cubix then flung himself into Kulminator, striking its EPU, destroying it and the Alien.

Kontraption: Dr. K's largest automaton, Kontraption serves as his blimp headquarters after his original base is destroyed. However, Kontraption can also turn into a large robot with great destructive capability.

Zombots: Dr. K's army of duplicating machines. When defeated, their parts can regenerate into new Zombots. In addition, they can evolve into larger, stronger versions of themselves, and transform other robots into Zombots with their attacks.

Voice cast 
 Hong Siho: Cubix, Mong
 Lee Mi-Ja Andrew Rannells (English dub): Haneul (Connor)
 Choi Duk Hee Veronica Taylor (English dub): Yuri (Abby)
 Woo Jung Shin Amy Birnbaum (English dub): Min Woo (Chip)
 Jung Mi Sook Rachael Lillis (English dub): Hela
 Lee Jung-gu: Demonix (Kilobot)
 Kim Ki-hyun Madeleine Blaustein (English dub): Dr. K
 Lee Hyun-jin Lauren Kling, Megan Hollingshead (English dub): Raska
 Bae Ju-young Eric Stuart (English dub): Dondon, Plump (Cerebrix), Doctor Ball (Diagnostix)
 Lee Jong Hyuk: Dr. Magnet (Kan-It), Dr. Nemo

List of episodes

Season 1 (2001-02)

Season 2 (2003)

Broadcast and home release 
In the United States, it aired on Kids' WB! on August 11, 2001 until May 10, 2003 with reruns until mid-2003. To help provide their affiliates a half-hour of educational and informational programming credit, the series was later rerun on FoxBox (owned by 4Kids Entertainment, later renamed 4KidsTV) from August 30, 2003 to June 12, 2004. The show remained off the air until July 24, 2010, when it resurfaced on 4Kids' then-current block The CW4Kids (later renamed Toonzai) on The CW. In 2012, the license for Cubix was purchased by Saban Brands and aired on the Vortexx block, but was removed from the block after four weeks on September 22, 2012 and replaced with another episode of Rescue Heroes. The show was pulled in Fall 2014 before Vortexx was replaced by the Litton-produced live-action block. Since September 2007, the show has been streaming online, being uploaded in its entirety as of early 2008, first on the now-defunct 4Kids.TV website and then on Hulu.

Both seasons were broadcast in the UK on Cartoon Network. As of May 2010, the series is airing in the UK on the kid-oriented TV channel Pop.

North American DVD releases of Cubix – Robots For Everyone were licensed by Funimation Entertainment.

 Cubix – Robots For Everyone Volume 1: The Unfixable Robot (February 4, 2003)

Video games 
The 3DO Company produced three video games based on the series. Cubix - Robots for Everyone: Race 'N Robots was released on the PlayStation and the Game Boy Color in 2001. Cubix Robots for Everyone: Clash 'N Bash was released on the Game Boy Advance in 2002. Cubix Robots for Everyone: Showdown was released on the PlayStation 2 and GameCube in 2003.

See also 
 Tobot
 Eon Kid

References

External links 
 
 Cubix: Robots for Everyone at 4KidsTV.tv
 

2001 South Korean television series debuts
2004 South Korean television series endings
2000s South Korean animated television series
2000s animated television series
South Korean children's animated action television series
South Korean children's animated adventure television series
South Korean children's animated comic science fiction television series
Computer-animated television series
Kids' WB original shows
Animated television series about children
Animated television series about robots
Animated characters
Television series set in the 2040s